Saint-André-d'Apchon is a commune in the Loire department in central France.

Population

See also
Communes of the Loire department

References

External links
 Official site
 Orchestre d'harmonie de St André d'Apchon

Communes of Loire (department)